Gil Nickel (1939 – October 30, 2003) was an American vintner. He was the owner of the historic Far Niente Winery in the Napa Valley. He also established the Dolce Winery and the Nickel & Nickel Winery.

Early life
Harold Gilliland Nickel was born in 1939 in Muskogee, Oklahoma. He graduated from Oklahoma State University in 1961, where he received a Bachelor of Science degree in Physics and Mathematics. He then served in the Oklahoma Air National Guard, serving one tour of duty the Vietnam War.

Career
He started his career by working as a missile analyst for the United States Navy Laboratory in Corona, California. He then moved back to his home state of Oklahoma, where he worked at Greenleaf Nursery, one of North America's largest wholesale nursery growers, founded in 1945, which was owned by his family and based in Tahlequah. He worked alongside his father and brother, later taking turns with his brother managing the business as he developed his Californian vineyard.

In 1976, he moved back to California, where he audited classes in oenology at the University of California at Davis. He also studied oenology in France. In 1979, he purchased the historic Far Niente Winery in Oakville, which had been established in 1885 by John Benson, a '49er of the Californian gold rush and uncle of the famous American impressionist painter Winslow Homer.  The winery was in disrepair having been abandoned 60 years previously during Prohibition and Nickel spent three years restoring it, including the impressive caves, carved out of solid rock, which he repaired and extended to 40,000 sq ft using a 22-foot English electric-hydraulic drill previously used in coal mines. The caves are now listed on the National Register of Historic Places. Three years later Far Niente pressed its first harvest in six decades.

In 1992, he started the Dolce Winery, which produced late-harvest dessert wine. With his son, Jeremy Nickel, he started Nickel & Nickel Winery in 1996. The business produced wines from the same vineyard as opposed to blends.

Personal life
He was married to Susan Nickel. They had a son, Jeremy Nickel. At the time of his death, he was married to Beth Nickel. A talented amateur vintage car racer, Gil competed internationally and won the FIA European Historic Sportscar Championship in 2000 in his 1964 Lotus 26R.  His extensive collection of classic cars is on display at Far Niente.

Death
Nickel died of cancer on October 30, 2003 in Oakville, California.

Legacy
In 2011, his son Jeremy sued the other owners of the Far Niente Winery for alleged misconduct.
The Gil Nickel Humanitarian Award given by the Jonsson Cancer Center Foundation at the University of California, Los Angeles is named in his honor.

References

1939 births
2003 deaths
People from Muskogee, Oklahoma
People from Napa County, California
Oklahoma State University alumni
California wine